The Anderson House on Kentucky Route 1913 near Haskingsville, Kentucky was listed on the National Register of Historic Places in 1984.

It was a -story, five-bay central passage plan house, built of brick laid in Flemish bond.

The house is no longer on the site.

References

Houses on the National Register of Historic Places in Kentucky
Federal architecture in Kentucky
Houses completed in 1800
National Register of Historic Places in Green County, Kentucky
1800 establishments in Kentucky
Former buildings and structures in Kentucky
Central-passage houses
Houses in Green County, Kentucky
Demolished but still listed on the National Register of Historic Places